Welfare chauvinism or welfare state nationalism is the political notion that welfare benefits should be restricted to certain groups, particularly to the natives of a country as opposed to immigrants. It is used as an argumentation strategy by right-wing populist parties, which describes a claimed connection between the problems of the welfare state and, in essence, immigration, but also other social groups such as welfare recipients and the unemployed. The focus is placed on categorizing state residents in two extremes: the "nourishing" and "debilitating" and the contradiction between them in the competition for the society's scarce resources.

Background 
The term welfare chauvinism was first used in social science in the 1990 paper "Structural changes and new cleavages: The progress parties in Denmark and Norway" by Jørgen Goul Andersen and Tor Bjørklund. They described it as the notion that "welfare services should be restricted to our own".

"Nourishing" and "debilitating"
In the description of society and the problems of the welfare state, populists, especially right-wing populists and welfare chauvinists, use a line of argument based on two extremes in which citizens are divided into 'nourishing' and 'debilitating' groups. The nourishing group consists of those who are a part of society's welfare and the country's prosperity: community builders; "the people"; the ordinary honest working man. The second group as standing outside of "the people" are the debilitating group, believed to be promoting or utilizing welfare without adding any value to society. The debilitating group consists of bureaucrats, academics, immigrants, the unemployed, welfare recipients and others. As such, welfare is seen as a system with embedded exclusion mechanisms.

Right-wing populists and welfare chauvinism
According to welfare chauvinists, the safety nets of the welfare state are for those whom they believe belong in the community. By the right-wing populist standard, affiliations with society are based in national, cultural and ethnic or racial aspects. Considered to be included in the category are those that are regarded as nourishing. The debilitating group (primarily immigrants) is considered to be outside of society and to be unjustly utilizing the welfare system. In essence, welfare chauvinists consider immigration to be a drain on societal scarce resources. They believe these resources should be used for the ethnically homogeneous native population, preferably children and the elderly.

The same principle of argument is, according to the academics Peer Scheepers, Mérove Gijsberts and Marcel Coenders, transferred to the labor market, where the competition for jobs is made out to be an ethnic conflict between immigrants and the native population. In times of high unemployment this rhetorical coupling amplifies and enhances the legitimacy of the welfare chauvinist and other xenophobic arguments.

Political parties and welfare chauvinism

Examples of contemporary political parties and groups that use, or used, a welfare chauvinist argumentation strategy: the Progress Party and Danish People's Party in Denmark, Finns Party in Finland, Freedom Party of Austria in Austria, Alternative for Germany in Germany, National Rally in France, Sweden Democrats and Alternative for Sweden in Sweden, Golden Dawn in Greece, Patrotic Front in Argentina, One Nation in Australia, Lega Nord in Italy, the Coalition Avenir Québec in Canada, the Party for Freedom in The Netherlands, and some branches of the Republican Party in the United States.

See also
 Chauvinism
 Eliminationism
 Ethnopluralism
 Ingroup bias
 Political incorrectness
 Populism
 Producerism
 Strasserism

References

Footnotes

Literature list 
 
 
 
 
 
 
 
 

Right-wing populism
Welfare
Political theories
Political terminology
Chauvinism
Far-right politics